Dan Roycroft (born February 23, 1978) is a Canadian cross-country skier who has been competing since 1998. He has competed in the 2003, 2005, and 2007 FIS Nordic World Ski Championships with his best placings being 29th in the 50 km event in 2007 and 31st in the 50 km in 2005.

Roycroft competed in the 2006 Winter Olympics, earning his best finish of 39th in the 15 km + 15 km double pursuit.  His best FIS World Cup result is 15th in the 15 km + 15 km double pursuit in Whistler Olympic Park, Canada in 2009.  He has 4 national championships in his career with two in 2003 (30 km classic & 50 km classic) one in 2006 (15 km skate), and one in 2007 (10 km Skate).

Roycroft created and runs Zone4 Systems which is an online registration system and race timing software company.  He has also created and runs the iLog Internet Training Log Systems for endurance athletes and coaches to record and maintain daily training logs.

External links

Zone4 Systems
iLog Internet Training Log System

1978 births
Canadian male cross-country skiers
Cross-country skiers at the 2006 Winter Olympics
Living people
Olympic cross-country skiers of Canada